Amediella is a genus of midges in the family Cecidomyiidae. The one described species - Amediella involuta - is known only from New Zealand.

References

Insects described in 2003
Taxa named by Mathias Jaschhof

Cecidomyiidae genera
Diptera of New Zealand
Monotypic Diptera genera